Sangeeta N. Bhatia (born 1968) is an American biological engineer and the John J. and Dorothy Wilson Professor at MIT’s Institute for Medical Engineering and Science and Electrical Engineering and Computer Science (EECS) at the Massachusetts Institute of Technology (MIT) in Cambridge, Massachusetts, United States. Bhatia's research investigates applications of micro- and nano-technology for tissue repair and regeneration.  She applies ideas from computer technology and engineering to the design of miniaturized biomedical tools for the study and treatment of diseases, in particular liver disease, hepatitis, malaria and cancer.

In 2003, she was named by the MIT Technology Review as one of the top 100 innovators in the world under the age of 35. 
She was also named a "Scientist to Watch" by The Scientist in 2006.
She has received multiple awards and has been elected to the National Academy of Sciences, the National Academy of Engineering, the National Academy of Medicine, and the National Academy of Inventors.

Bhatia's dissertation became the basis for Microfabrication in tissue engineering and bioartificial organs (1999).
Bhatia co-authored the first undergraduate textbook on tissue engineering, Tissue engineering (2004), written for senior-level and first-year graduate courses with Bernhard Palsson.
She was a co-editor of Microdevices in Biology and Medicine (2009) 
and Biosensing: International Research and Development (2005).

Early life and education
Bhatia's parents emigrated from India to Boston, Massachusetts; her father was an engineer and her mother was one of the first women to receive an MBA in India. Bhatia was motivated to become an engineer after her 10th grade biology class and a trip with her father into an MIT lab to see a demonstration of an ultrasound machine for cancer treatment.

Bhatia studied bioengineering at Brown University where she joined a research group studying artificial organs which convinced her to pursue graduate study the field. After graduating with honors in 1990, 
Bhatia was initially rejected from the MD-PhD program run by the Harvard-MIT Division of Health Sciences and Technology (HST) but was accepted into the Mechanical Engineering masters program. She was later accepted to the HST MD-PhD program where she was advised by Mehmet Toner and Martin Yarmush.  She received a PhD in 1997 and an MD in 1999, and completed postdoctoral training at Massachusetts General Hospital.

Career
Bhatia joined the faculty at the University of California, San Diego (UCSD) in 1998. As an assistant professor, Bhatia was awarded a five-year Packard Fellowship for Science and Engineering from the David and Lucile Packard Foundation in 1999. She was named a 2001 "Teacher of the Year" in the Bioengineering Department at the Jacobs School of Engineering, 
and was named an Innovator under 35 by MIT Technology Review in 2003.

In 2005, she left UCSD and joined the MIT faculty in the Division of Health Sciences & Technology and the Department of Electrical Engineering and Computer Science.  Bhatia was named a "Scientist to Watch" by The Scientist in 2006 and became a Howard Hughes Medical Institute investigator in 2008.

Bhatia currently directs the Laboratory for Multiscale Regenerative Technologies at MIT and is affiliated with Brigham and Women's Hospital and the Koch Institute for Integrative Cancer Research.
Bhatia is a strong advocate for gender equity and inclusivity in STEM fields.
Bhatia helped to found the Diversity Committee of the Biomedical Engineering Society, and is involved with MIT's Society of Women Engineers.  While at MIT, she helped to start Keys to Empowering Youth, a program that brings middle-school girls to visit hi-tech labs as a way to encourage them in science and technology. Bhatia and her husband, Jagesh Shah have two daughters.

In 2015, Bhatia was elected a member of the National Academy of Engineering for tissue engineering and tissue regeneration technologies, stem cell differentiation, and preclinical drug evaluation.

Research
Bhatia's doctoral work focused on the development of a way to keep liver cells functioning outside of the human body. She adapted ideas from computer chip design and engineering to the microfabrication of a substrate for liver cells. 
She successfully applied techniques from photolithography to petri dishes, to create a substrate that would support growth of a functioning microliver in a dish.
Bhatia also used co-cultures of more than one cell type to prevent dedifferentiation of the liver cells, building on the work of Christiane Guguen-Guillouzo in France. 
She and her coworkers have also used techniques from 3D printing to create a lattice of sugar as a framework for a synthetic vascular system with the goal of supporting larger tissue structures such as an artificial liver.
Her work was one of the first projects at MIT in the area of biological micro-electromechanical systems, or Bio-MEMS. She is interested in using arrays of living cells as high-throughput platforms to study fundamental aspects of Bio-MEMS in stem cells.

Bhatia's research in the Laboratory for Multiscale Regenerative Technologies (LMRT) continues to apply micro- and nanotechnology ideas to tissue repair and regeneration.
She studies the interactions between hepatocytes (liver cells) and their microenvironment and develops microfabrication tools to improve cellular therapies for liver disease in an approach referred to as hepatic tissue engineering.
The goal is to maximize hepatocyte function,
facilitate design of effective cellular therapies for liver disease, and improve fundamental understanding of liver physiology and pathophysiology. 
The approach has been used to study diseases including hepatitis and malaria.

Since 2008, with assistance from the Medicines for Malaria Venture (MMV), and the Bill & Melinda Gates Foundation her lab has worked on the development of Plasmodium falciparum and Plasmodium vivax cell-based assays. These are used to support the study of parasites and explore possible differential drug sensitivity and identify new anti-relapse medicines for malaria.

Bhatia's laboratory is also involved in a multidisciplinary effort to develop nanomaterials as tools for biological studies and as multifunctional agents for cancer therapies. 
Interests center around nanoparticles and nanoporous materials that can be designed to perform complex tasks. 
They may be able to home in on a tumor, signal changes in cells or tissues, enhance imaging, or release a therapeutic component.
In 2002, Bhatia worked with Erkki Ruoslahti and Warren Chan to develop phage-derived peptide-targeted nanomaterials, or quantum dots, for in vivo targeting of tumors.
By adding tumor-enzyme molecules to nanoparticles she has also created specialized nanoparticles that can react with diseased tissue to create synthetic biomarkers detectable in blood or urine samples.  Another project involves engineering beneficial probiotics with the ability to detect or treat cancer cells.

Bhatia holds a number of patents for both clinical and biotechnological applications of engineering principles.  In 2015, her company Glympse Bio received initial funding from Kiran Mazumdar-Shaw and Theresia Gouw at Aspect Ventures. In 2018, Glympse received $22 million to further develop “activity sensors” to identify diseases and monitor patient response to drugs.

Books

Awards
Bhatia is the recipient of a number of awards and honors including the following: 
 2019, Othmer Gold Medal, Science History Institute and others
 2018, honorary Doctorate, Utrecht University
 2017, Catalyst Award, Science Club for Girls
 2015, Heinz Award, Heinz Family Foundation, in the Technology, the Economy and Employment category "for her seminal work in tissue engineering and disease detection, including the cultivation of functional liver cells outside of the human body, and for her passion in promoting the advancement of women in the STEM fields." 
 2014, Lemelson-MIT Prize, Massachusetts Institute of Technology  "for her dedication to the next generation of scientists, and groundbreaking inventions to improve human health and patient care on a global scale."
 2011, BEAM (Brown Engineering Alumni Medal) Award, Brown University School of Engineering
 2008, Howard Hughes Medical Institute investigator
 1999, Packard Fellowship, David and Lucile Packard Foundation

References

External links
 Laboratory for Multiscale Regenerative Technologies
 
 NOVA profile

Howard Hughes Medical Investigators
Brown University School of Engineering alumni
MIT School of Engineering faculty
MIT School of Engineering alumni
Harvard Medical School alumni
American people of Indian descent
Indian nanotechnologists
1968 births
Living people
American bioengineers
American women engineers
Women bioengineers
Indian women engineers
American women biologists
Indian women biologists
20th-century Indian biologists
20th-century Indian engineers
20th-century Indian women scientists
20th-century American women
Indian bioengineers
Members of the United States National Academy of Engineering
Members of the United States National Academy of Sciences
20th-century women engineers
21st-century women engineers
American women academics
21st-century American women
Members of the National Academy of Medicine